The  is a type of traditional Japanese topknot haircut worn by men. It is most commonly associated with the Edo period (1603–1867) and samurai, and in recent times with sumo wrestlers. It was originally a method of using hair to hold a samurai kabuto helmet steady atop the head in battle, and became a status symbol among Japanese society.

In a traditional Edo-period , the top of the head is shaved. The remaining hair was oiled and waxed before being tied into a small tail folded onto the top of the head in the characteristic topknot.

History
The origins of the  can be traced back to the Heian period. During this period, aristocrats wore special cap like crowns as part of their official clothing. To secure the crown in place, the hair would be tied near the back of the head.

Between the 1580s (towards the end of the Warring States period, 1467–1615) and the 1630s (the beginning of the Edo period, 1603–1867), Japanese cultural attitudes to men's hair shifted; where a full head of hair and a beard had been valued as a sign of manliness in the preceding militaristic era, in the ensuing period of peace, this gradually shifted until a beard and an unshaven pate were viewed as barbaric, and resistant of the peace that had resulted from two centuries of civil war. This change was also enforced during the Japanese invasion of Joseon (1592–1598), where some Japanese commanders forced the submitted Koreans to shave their heads to this hairstyle, as a method of converting their identities to that of Japanese.

A shaven pate (the ) became required of the samurai classes by the early Edo period, and by the 1660s, all men, commoner or samurai, were forbidden from wearing beards, with the  deemed mandatory.

Sumo

However, the hair may be thinned in this region or the crown of the head shaved, called , to allow the topknot to sit more neatly.

Given the uniqueness of the style in modern Japan, the Sumo Association employs specialist hairdressers called  to cut and prepare sumo wrestlers' hair.

The  is of such symbolic importance in sumo that snipping it off is the centerpiece of a wrestler's retirement ceremony. Dignitaries and other important people in a wrestler's life are invited to take one snip, with the final one taken by his trainer. For most wrestlers who never reached a sekitori rank, his retirement ceremony will be the only time he wears the more elaborate .

See also
 List of hairstyles
 Khokhol
 Queue, the Qing-dynasty Chinese hairstyle also involving a shaved pate

References

Further reading

External links
 
 

Sumo terminology
Hairstyles
Samurai
Japanese fashion
2010s fashion